The 2022–23 season is the 94th in the history of Palermo F.C. and their first season back in the second division since 2019. The club is participating in Serie B and Coppa Italia.

Players

First team squad 

Players in italics were trasferred out during the season.

Transfers

Summer 2022

Winter 2023

Pre-season and friendlies

Competitions

Overall record

Serie B

League table

Results summary

Results by round

Matches 
The league fixtures were announced on 15 July 2022.

Coppa Italia

Statistics

Appearances, goals and assists

Disciplinary record

Goals conceded and clean sheets

Attendances

Notes

References

Palermo F.C. seasons
Palermo